This is a List of New Warriors Issues. New Warriors is a Marvel Comics superhero team, traditionally consisting of young adult heroes. They first appeared in issues 411 and 412 of the Marvel Comics title The Mighty Thor. From 1990 the New Warriors were featured in an eponymous series written by Fabian Nicieza with art by Mark Bagley until 1996. The series lasted for 75 issues and four annuals.

A short-lived revival was launched in 1999, lasting for ten issues, and a mini-series followed in 2005. A fourth series was launched in June 2007.

Issues
Issue #1 - "From the Ground Up" (Cameos by Captain America and She-Hulk) - July 1, 1990
Issue #2 - Mirror Moves - Aug. 1, 1990
Issue #3 - I Am, Therefore, I Think - Sept. 1, 1990
Issue #4 - Genetech Potential - Oct. 1, 1990
Issue #5 - The Man Who Stole Tomorrow - Nov. 1, 1990
Issue #6 - The Inhuman Condition - Dec. 1, 1990
Issue #7 - Hard Choices, Part 1: The Heart of the Hunter - Jan. 1, 1991
Issue #8 - Hard Choices, Part 2: Devils at the Doorsteps - Feb. 1, 1991
Issue #9 - Hard Choices, Part 3: Following the Line Along the Middle - March 1, 1991
Issue #10 - Rumble - April 1, 1991
Issue #11 - Forever Yesterday, Part 1: Days of Present Past - May 1, 1991
Issue #12 - Forever Yesterday, Part 2: A Betrayal of Hope - June 1, 1991
Issue #13 - Forever Yesterday, Part 3: A World for the Winning - July 1, 1991
Issue #14 - The Breeze Of An Underwater Wind - Aug. 1, 1991
Issue #15 - The Sushi People - Sept. 1, 1991
Issue #16 - Ground War - Oct. 1, 1991
Issue #17 - Sore Winners - Nov. 1, 1991
Issue #18 - Everything You Always Wanted to Know About the Taylor Foundation but were Afraid to ask - Dec. 1, 1991
Issue #19 - Sympathy For The Devil - Jan. 1, 1992
Issue #20 - The Breaking Point - Feb. 1, 1992
Issue #21 - The Folding Circle - March 1, 1992
Issue #22 - Nothing But The Truth, Part 1: The Stolen Children - April 1, 1992
Issue #23 - Nothing But The Truth, Part 2: Passed Lies - May 1, 1992
Issue #24 - Nothing But The Truth, Part 3: The Cheating Corner - June 1, 1992
Issue #25 - Nothing But The Truth, Part 4: Justifiable Homicide - July 1, 1992
Issue #26 - The Next Step - Aug. 1, 1992
Issue #27 - Dark Side - Sept. 1, 1992
Issue #28 - Heavy Turbulence - Oct. 1, 1992
Issue #29 - World War One: This Land Must Change - Nov. 1, 1992
Issue #30 - World War Two ... or Land Must Burn - Dec. 1, 1992
Issue #31 - Ruins - Jan. 1, 1993
Issue #32 - Forces Of Darkness, Forces of Light, Act 1: Crawling to the Shadows - Feb. 1, 1993
Issue #33 - Forces Of Darkness, Forces of Light, Act 2: The Soul Canyons - March 1, 1993
Issue #34 - Forces Of Darkness, Forces of Light, Act 3: Breaking the Back of Love - April 1, 1993
Issue #35 - Hawks and Doves - May 1, 1993
Issue #36 - The scales of Justice - June 1, 1993
Issue #37 - Family Values - July 1, 1993
Issue #38 - Family honor, poisoned memories - Aug. 1, 1993
Issue #39 - Family viewing - Sept. 1, 1993
Issue #40 - The Starlost, Part one: Power Tools - Oct. 1, 1993
Issue #41 - The Starlost, Part two: Power Plays - Nov. 1, 1993
Issue #42 - The Starlost, Part three: Power Full - Dec. 1, 1993
Issue #43 - And Justice For All? - Jan. 1, 1994
Issue #44 - Underwater Fire - Feb. 1, 1994
Issue #45 - Child's Play, Part 2: Sleeping with the Enemy - March 1, 1994
Issue #46 - Childs Play, Part 4 - April 1, 1994

References

New Warriors